ArchOne is an Arch Linux based operating system, optimized for Acer Aspire One netbooks, but usable on other PCs with similar hardware.

Features 
ArchOne is preconfigured to support the hardware of the Acer Aspire One. Drivers for network, sound, graphics, special keys and the webcam are active and make the hardware ready to use immediately upon first boot.

ArchOne uses a rolling-release model for upgrades.

Edition 
ArchOne has three versions, each with a different desktop manager: Openbox edition, GNOME edition and the KDE edition., but with the same application software, including Firefox, Google Chrome, Skype, KeePassX, Hsoconnect, Gparted, GIMP, OpenOffice.org, VLC, MPlayer.

External links 
 ArchOne Website
 Arch Linux Website

References 

Arch-based Linux distributions
Pacman-based Linux distributions
Linux distributions
Rolling Release Linux distributions